The aruval, also known as koḍuvāḷ, is a type of billhook machete from southern India, particularly common in the Indian states of Tamil Nadu and Kerala. It is a type of long sickle with a knife-like scythe-handle, and is used both as a tool and a weapon. Tamils reserve the weapon as a symbol of karupannar. In popular culture, it is sometimes associated with gangsters. In movies, it is used as a weapon of choice. In Kerala, its primary use is for agriculture, mainly in coconut cutting, clearing pathways, cutting wood and other uses.

Introduction
An aruval usually measures 3–6 feet in length (hand sickle measures 1.5 feet). The blade of this weapon originates at the grip and extends to the main part of the blade. It can be described as a sickle with an extension. It can also be thought of as a sword with a reverse curve. The shorter versions were handy for breaking apart coconuts, and the longer versions were more like battle weapons. The shorter version is usually seen in small villages. Blades are mostly straight with a curve towards the end, allowing it to function as a grabbing tool. The straight portion of the blade is also used for cutting, like a standard knife.

Variants and usage
While farmers typically employ the standard billhook machete kathir aruvāl koyttharivaal for harvesting crops, a longer variation called the veecharuvāl is used for clearing through wooded areas.  In Kerala, Malayalam language references the semi-circular knife for paddy, called "koduval" and the regular sized billhook machete is known as "vaakathi" (coconut cutting); while the veecharuval is known simply as aruval. The veecharuval was also used as a weapon and is still used as such for self-defence in rural areas or gang warfare in cities. When not in use, the weaponised aruval was worn on the back, with the blade pointing downwards and the handle just behind the user's head. Some aruvals, such as those used in worship of the Khaval Dheivam, are as long as 3.5 feet.

See also
 Aiyanar
 Billhook
 Karuppu Sami
 Machete
 Madurai Veeran
 Village deities of South India

Blade weapons
Machetes
Weapons of India
Indian melee weapons